The 2013 mayoral election in Allentown, Pennsylvania was held on November 5, 2013, and resulted in the incumbent mayor Ed Pawlowski, a member of the Democratic Party, being re-elected to a third term over Independent candidate William Michael Donovan.

Background
Incumbent mayor Ed Pawlowski was seeking his third term as mayor, having first been elected in 2005. Simultaneously, Pawlowski would run for the Democratic nomination for governor in the 2014 Pennsylvania gubernatorial election.

Campaign
Pawlowski won the Democratic primary unopposed while the Republicans failed to field any candidates. Some of Pawlowski's supporters launched a write in campaign and won the Republican nomination for him making him the first, and only, cross-filed candidate in Allentown history. Despite this, Pawlowski would be challenged in the general election by former city councilmen and independent W. Michael Donovan. During the campaign Pawlowski raised $224,005 in campaign funds and vastly outspent Donovan who only raised $13,140. However, most of the money Pawlowski raised for his mayoral campaign came from galas, fundraisers, and other events for his gubernatorial campaign. Pawlowski would defeat Donovan in the general election with almost 62% of the vote.

Results

See also
 2013 United States elections
 Cross-filing
 Mayors of Allentown, Pennsylvania

References

Allentown
 2013
Allentown